TIM 011 is an educational or personal computer for school  microcomputer developed by Mihajlo Pupin Institute of Serbia in 1987. There were about 1200 TIM-011 computers in Serbian schools in the starting from 1987 and in 1990s.

It were based on CP/M with Hitachi HD64180, Z80A enhanced CPU with MMU , 256KB RAM standard, 3.5" floppy drives and integrated 512 X 256 green-screen monitors with 4 levels of intensity.

Reference literature
 Dragoljub Milićević, Dušan Hristović (Ed): "Računari TIM" (TIM Computers), Naučna knjiga, Belgrade 1990.
 D.B.Vujaklija, N.Markovic (Ed): "50 Years of Computing in Serbia (50 godina računarstva u Srbiji- Hronika digitalnih decenija)", DIS, IMP and PC-Press, Belgrade 2011.

References

Z80-based home computers
Personal computers
Microcomputers
Mihajlo Pupin Institute